Trinidad Head (Yurok: Chuerewa'  ) is a rocky promontory surrounded by sea stacks sheltering Trinidad Harbor, adjacent to the town of Trinidad in Humboldt County, California, USA, designated as California Historical Landmark #146.

History
On June 9, 1775, two Spanish Naval explorers, Bruno de Heceta and Juan Francisco de la Bodega y Quadra anchored in Trinidad Bay. Two days later, on Trinity Sunday, June 11, 1775,  Trinidad Head was claimed for Spain in the name of Charles III by Heceta, his men and two Franciscan fathers who erected a cross on the summit. When Sebastian Rodriguez Cermeno, Captain of the Portuguese ship "San Augustin," discovered and entered the Trinidad Bay in November of 1595, he did not anchor for fear of hitting submerged rocks. Over the next 75 years, Spanish, Russian and British ships landed at Trinidad Head for sea otters, fresh water and refuge from storms.

The harbor and Trinidad Head were mapped as part of A.D. Bache's United States Coast Survey under the direction of Lieutenant Commander William P. McArthur.

Much of Trinidad Head was transferred to the city of Trinidad in 1983. The  came with the condition that the property be maintained for public recreation. The southerly  of the promontory containing the lighthouse are owned by the Bureau of Land Management (BLM) in 2014. In January 2017, Congress added Trinidad Head to the onshore acres of the California Coastal National Monument. President Barack Obama used his executive power under the 1906 Antiquities Act to designate this site as a unit of the National Monument.

Geology
Trinidad Head is composed of metamorphosed gabbro embedded in the surrounding Franciscan melange, topped with Pleistocene sands and gravels.

Observatories
The Trinidad Head Lighthouse was built 1871 and remains in operation.
NASA's Advanced Global Atmospheric Gases Experiment (AGAGE) began observations of key ozone depleting substances and greenhouse gases at Trinidad Head in 1995. The site was updated in May 2005 with a system which measures more than 40 trace gases involved in stratospheric ozone depletion, climate change, and air quality.
Trinidad Head Observatory of the National Oceanic and Atmospheric Administration began operation in 2002, monitoring regional and global meteorology.

Management
The BLM manages the facility cooperatively with the City of Trinidad, the Trinidad Rancheria, the Trinidad Museum Society and the Yurok Tribe. Hiking trails were established by the city in 1984.

References

Geology of California
Trinidad
Landforms of Humboldt County, California